The Big East Conference Women's Basketball Player of the Year award is given to the women's basketball player in the Big East Conference voted as the top performer by the conference coaches. It was first awarded at the end of the 1982–83 season, the first in which the Big East sponsored women's basketball. The current Big East claims the history of the original Big East Conference, which split along football lines in 2013, with three members leaving to join the Atlantic Coast Conference, the seven members that did not field teams in NCAA Division I FBS leaving to form a new Big East Conference, and the remaining FBS schools continuing to operate under the original Big East charter with the new name of American Athletic Conference (The American).

The head coaches of the league's teams submit their votes following the end of the regular season and before the conference's tournament in early March. The coaches cannot vote for their own players.

The first award went to Debbie Beckford of St. John's in 1983. There have been seven multiple winners so far. Rebecca Lobo and Diana Taurasi, both of UConn, Notre Dame's Skylar Diggins, and Villanova's Maddy Siegrist each won the award twice in their careers. Shelly Pennefather of Villanova and Kerry Bascom and Maya Moore of UConn, were each three-time winners. Pennefather and Bascom won all of their awards consecutively, while Moore did not.

So far, voting has resulted in a tie once, in 1984 when both Jennifer Bruce and Kathy Finn won the award.

Eight players have also won National Player of the Year awards. Rebecca Lobo, Ruth Riley, Sue Bird, Diana Taurasi, Maya Moore, and Paige Bueckers are all recipients of the Naismith College Player of the Year award. Shelly Pennefather, Lobo, Jennifer Rizzotti, Bird, Taurasi, and Moore are all recipients of the Wade Trophy. Moore and Bueckers are also recipients of the John R. Wooden Award.

UConn, a founding member of the original Big East that moved to The American with the conference split and joined the current Big East in 2020, has the most all-time awards, with 18, and the most individual winners, with 12. Apart from UConn, the only current Big East members with more than one winner are Villanova, with three players who combined to win six awards; DePaul, with three players who each won one award; and Creighton and Marquette, each with two players who claimed one award. Three current Big East members have yet to have a winner—Seton Hall, which was a charter member of the Big East in 1979, and Butler and Xavier, both of which joined the Big East at its 2013 relaunch.

Key

Winners

Winners by school

See also 
Big East Conference Men's Basketball Player of the Year
Big East Conference Men's Basketball Rookie of the Year

References 

Awards established in 1983

NCAA Division I women's basketball conference players of the year